Bani Nawf is a sub-district located in Al Madan District, 'Amran Governorate, Yemen. Bani Nawf had a population of 11445 according to the 2004 census.

References 

Sub-districts in Al Madan District